Nadège August (also credited as Nadège Auguste) is an American actress, producer, and podcast host.

Biography
August was born in Brooklyn, New York, but was raised in Haiti from the ages of eight to fourteen. In 2001, she made her feature film debut in role of Ursula, the French-speaking girlfriend of Clifton Powell, in The Brothers. Since then she has appeared in The Princess Diaries 2: Royal Engagement and the female lead in the award-winning independent film Runt. She also starred in and produced the short film Solus, which was screened at several film festivals. She has appeared on episodes of the television series Criminal Minds, 1600 Penn, Dexter, ER, The Unit, and Accidentally on Purpose. She is the creator, writer, executive producer, and star actress of the web series Bougie Dilemma on YouTube. Joan in Tyler Perry's Ruthless (TV series) on BET+ and plays Darlene Wilson in Nickelodeon Young Dylan

August has also performed on stage, and is a member of the Actors Studio organization. In 2019, She won Desert Theatre League Outstanding Supporting Actress Award for playing in David Lindsay-Abaire Good People Coachella Valley Repertory. In 2008, she received an NAACP Theatre Award nomination for her role of Abbie Putnam in a production of Eugene O'Neill's Desire Under the Elms.

August hosts the weekly podcast What the Fockery?

Filmography

Film

Television

Awards and recognition
 2019: DTL Outstanding Supporting Actress - Drama- Professional Winner
 2008: NAACP Theatre Award nomination, Best Supporting Female - Local, Desire Under the Elms
 2016 NAACP Theatre Award for Best Lead Female- Local  Nomination for "Sunset Baby" by Dominique Morisseau

References

External links
 
Bougie Dilemma on YouTube
 Short film, "Solus" on Famecast.com

Year of birth missing (living people)
Living people
American film actresses
American television actresses
Actresses of Haitian descent
People from Brooklyn
21st-century American women